Indian Institute of Management Ahmedabad (IIM Ahmedabad) is a business school, located in Ahmedabad, Gujarat, India. The school has been accorded the status of an Institute of National Importance by Ministry of Human Resources, Government of India in 2017.

Established in 1961, the institute offers master's degree programs in management and agri-business management, a fellowship program and a number of executive training programs. The institute's founding director is Ravi J. Matthai. Other notable founding figures were the Indian physicist Vikram Sarabhai, Indian businessman Kasturbhai Lalbhai and Indian educator Kamla Chowdhary.

IIM Ahmedabad is widely regarded as the leading business school in India and one of the most prestigious business schools in the world.

History

IIM Ahmedabad was established on 11 December 1961 with the active support of the Government of India, the Government of Gujarat, Harvard Business School, and prominent members of Indian industry. The physicist Vikram Sarabhai and businessman Kasturbhai Lalbhai, both natives of Ahmedabad, played pivotal roles in setting up the institute. The institute's Kasturbhai Lalbhai Management Development Centre and a Kasturbhai Lalbhai Chair in Entrepreneurship are named in his honor. The management educator Ravi J. Matthai and several other Ahmedabad-based businessmen also played a major role in its creation. Kamla Chowdhary was the first faculty of the institute, and the coordinator of programmes between 1962 and 1965.
 
Established in 1961, the institute offers master's degree programs in management and agri-business management, a fellowship program and a number of executive training programs. The institute's founding director was Ravi J. Matthai. Other notable founding figures were the Indian physicist Vikram Sarabhai, Indian businessman Kasturbhai Lalbhai and Indian educator Kamla Chowdhary.
 
In 2020 it was ranked first among the business schools in India by the National Institutional Ranking Framework. During the period 2017–21, it has been ranked first amongst the management institutions.

Campus 
The IIM Ahmedabad campus is situated across 102 acres in Vastrapur, Ahmedabad. The campus houses the academic blocks, faculty offices, student and faculty accommodation, the Vikram Sarabhai Library, the R.J. Matthai Auditorium, the Louis Kahn Plaza, the International Management Development Centre, the Kasturbhai Lalbhai Management Development Centre, the Centre for Innovation, Incubation and Entrepreneurship, sport facilities, several food outlets and merchandise stores.

Architecture 
In 1962, the IIM Ahmedabad board came to a formal agreement with the National Institute of Design (NID) for the latter to undertake the task of designing the IIM Ahmedabad campus. The National Institute of Design appointed American architect Louis Kahn and B.V. Doshi as architects for the project. Kahn worked on the IIMA project from 1962 until his death in 1974.

Kahn's architecture is characterized by the use of exposed red bricks, the extensive use of geometric shapes in hostels and academic blocks and vast corridors outside the classrooms. He combined Indian traditional and vernacular architecture and modern architecture skillfully. A number of tourists and architecture students often visit the campus for its phenomenal architectural impact.

Vikram Sarabhai Library 
The library is named after the institute's founder, renowned physicist Vikram Sarabhai. The library was instituted in 1962 and houses over 193000 books and has online subscriptions to greater than 24000 journals. The library provides access to 100+ digital databases relating to scholarly, company and industry information to the IIMA community. The library is located at the Louis Kahn Plaza. In 2019, the library received Award of Distinction’ at the UNESCO Asia Pacific Award for Cultural Heritage Conservation 2019.

Student accommodation 
Students are provided single room accommodation in the 33 fully furnished dormitories spread across the campus. Married students can opt to live with their family in married students' hostels. Stay in dormitories is mandatory for students. Basic amenities including washing machines, refrigerators and TVs are available at each dorm.

Logo 
The logo of the institute has the motif of the ‘Tree of Life’. The logo is inspired by a carved stone latticework jaali in the 16th century mosque of Siddi Saiyyad in old part of Ahmedabad.

Organisation and administration

Schools
JSW School of Public Policy - Set up with financial contribution from JSW Steel Ltd worth Rs. 50 crore, the school is engaged in research on policy formulation and design, policy choice, and policy impact.

Research centers
The university has the following sector or mission oriented centres which are staffed by faculty members:
Centre for Innovation, Incubation & Entrepreneurship (CIIE) – It was originally set up in 2012 as a research institution, with a grant pool from Government of Gujarat, the Department of Science and Technology (DST) and IIMA. It now operates as a section 8 non profit company under Companies Act 2013. The centre supports 40–60 ventures every year through its accelerator programs, incubation spaces and seed investment program. The centre has about 20,000 sq ft of incubation space in Ahmedabad, 30,000 sq ft in Pune and is in the process of setting up another one in Pune spread over 10,000 sq ft. The center also has a Young IIMAvericks Fellowship/Internship program for batch of graduating students who decide to take the route of entrepreneurship. In 2015, CIIE was invited to co-host the first India-US Startup Konnect in the Silicon Valley to showcase the strengths of India's startup ecosystem. In 2017, Securities and Exchange Board of India gave approval to Bharat Innovation Fund to operate as a Venture Capital Fund and also secured Category – I Venture Capital Fund status.
India Gold Policy Centre
Centre for Management of Health Services
Gender Centre
Misra Centre for Financial Markets and Economy
NSE Centre for Behavioral Science in Finance, Economics and Marketing
Centre for Transportation and Logistics
Centre for Digital Transformation
Ashank Desai Centre for Leadership and Organisational Development (CLOD)
Centre for Digital Transformation, set up in collaboration with Bank of America
Arun Duggal ESG Centre for Research and Innovation

Academics 
IIM Ahmedabad offers various full-time and part-time postgraduate programmes, leading to an MBA degree. It also offers diploma programmes.

Exchange programs 
IIMA has affiliations with 78 leading business schools across the world. In 2015–16, 140 students from IIMA spent a semester at affiliate business schools across North America, Europe, Africa, Australia, and the Asia Pacific region, while 87 students from foreign colleges spent a semester at IIMA for the same period. The institute has a Dual Degree and one term exchange programs arrangement with a few business schools such as HEC Paris, Bocconi University, EDHEC Business school, University of Louvain, ESSEC Business School in Paris, University of Cologne, ESCP Europe and Emlyon Business School. Some of the students going on exchange receive scholarships from the institute, DAAD Germany, the French Government and participating schools.

Admission 
IIMA offers different academic programs and has admission processes and eligibility respectively. The IIMA admission process is based on the course candidate opt for. CAT score is the basic exam to apply for admission in PGP, PGP-FaBM, ePGP and ePGD-ABA. Admission to PGPX is on the basis of GMAT/GRE only. Apart from that, they accept applications from other entrance exams like GRE, GMAT, GATE, UGC-JRF & ICAR-SRF. The next major aspect for admission is the category (GEN & EWS, NC & OBC, SC, ST, PWD & PWD (ST) ), Total seats are further divided into the category where IIM accept admission on the category basis. Good academic record and percentage score is another major aspect. 

IIM also conducts its analytics writing test and personal interview (AWT & PI) in Ahmedabad, Banglore, Hyderabad, Kolkata, & New Delhi cities of selected candidates. Seats in IIMA are reserved,  based on government instruction 27% of seats are reserved for NC-OBC,  15% for SC, 7.5% for ST candidates, 5% for Persons with Benchmark Disabilities (PwD), and up to 10% for Economically Weaker Sections (EWS).

Rankings

Worldwide, the Financial Times has ranked IIM Ahmedabad 62 in its Global MBA Ranking 2022. The QS Global MBA Rankings 2023 ranked it 44 in the world and 8 in Asia. It was ranked 51 by The Economist in its 2021 Full-time B-school ranking.

In India, IIM Ahmedabad was ranked first among management schools in India by the National Institutional Ranking Framework in 2022 as well as Outlook Indias "Top Public MBA Institutions In India" survey. It was ranked second by Business Today "India's Top Five B-Schools Yearly Ranking In 2022".

Student life

Events

The Red Brick Summit (TRBS) 
The Red Brick Summit or TRBS, named after the red brick walls that the campus is known for, replaced 'Big Four' individual management fests/summits (Confluence, Amatheon, ConneXions, and Insight) as an umbrella management symposium. Instituted in 2017, the mega event – the biggest management symposium in Asia with a footfall of 20,000 students across more than 250 Indian and 30 international universities – sees renowned speakers talking about issues relevant to management and public policy, national-level business competitions, and workshops attended by hundreds. The speakers include Nirmala Sitharaman (Union Cabinet Minister, Defence), Maneka Gandhi (Union Cabinet Minister, Women and Child Development), Hasmukh Adia (Revenue Secretary, Government of India), and Deep Kalra (Founder-CEO of MakeMyTrip).

Chaos 
Chaos is the annual cultural festival of IIMA. Its yearly editions have been centred on themes like diversity, colour or going green. The cultural festivities draws footfalls of around 50,000 visitors from Ahmedabad over four days and participation from institutes across the country. Pro-nites (events hosted by professional artists) are especially a huge success with a large number of top class artists coming and performing on one stage. In the past, Chaos has witnessed musical performances by Jagjit Singh, Amit Trivedi, Raghu Dixit, Mohit Chauhan, Armaan Malik and Shankar–Ehsaan–Loy to name a few.

Placements 
The placement process at IIM Ahmedabad is a student-driven process that institutionalizes placements for the entire batch. The Placement Committee elected by the student liaisons between the Institute administration, students, and recruiters. Placements for the PGP and PGP-FABM courses are characterized by two phases – summer placements for the first-year batch and final placements for the graduating batch. The summers process is conducted in Nov/Dec for the first year. The second-year placement committee handles the process for them. The placement process for graduating is conducted in two stages. The first is the laterals process in January where firms interview students with prior work experience and offer them mid-level managerial positions. The second stage is the final placement process in around February. This process is handled by the newly elected committee among the PGP1s to avoid any conflict of interest and ensure a fair process. Companies from multiple sectors across different geographies hire candidates for a wide range of functions

Impact

Business 
IIMA has been instrumental in influencing the business landscape of the country, with the highest proportion of BSE 500 CEOs (who have an MBA) coming from IIMA. More than 400 students provide live consulting for businesses through the Forum for Industry Interaction annually. 84 projects were undertaken by students in 2015.

Monetary Policy 
IIMA has played a key role in India's monetary policy - four Governors of the Reserve Bank of India have been associated with IIMA (three as faculty - C. Rangarajan, I. G. Patel, and Y. V. Reddy, and one as student - Raghuram Rajan). Two faculty members (Ravindra Dholakia and Jayanth Varma) have been members of the Monetary Policy Committee (India).

Public Policy 
A key study by IIMA on salaries in the private and public sector helped shape the 7th Central Pay Commission's recommendations. Professors from IIMA have been appointed to eminent panels and committees, responsible for shaping key policies, by the government. IIMA's Gold Policy Centre is in the process of publishing a paper on the government's Gold Monetization Policy. The Punjab Prisons Department has signed a MoU with IIMA for a prison modernization project. The Central Vigilance Commission has asked IIMA to come up with India's first index to measure perceptions of graft and corruption, based on the Corruption Perceptions Index of Transparency International. Key studies on state health indexes have also been released by IIMA, helping to highlight the progress made on the same by various states across the country.

Training 
Through its Executive Education programs, IIMA will train key senior officers from Chhattisgarh, as well as state Chief Minister Raman Singh, focussing on key management practices and project management. Officers from the Delhi Jal Board will also undergo training on Project and Risk Management. A MoU has also been signed between the Institute and the Delhi Govt to train the principals of all 1024 schools run by it, with the training to be conducted by the RTE Resource Centre.

Social

RTE-RC 
The Right to Education Resource Centre (RTE-RC), started by a group of students under the guidance of Ankur Sarin, helps parents fill out forms and get children admitted under the RTE Act, while also raising awareness about the issue of underutilization of the Act. The centre received 1800 application in its first year of operation, raising the number of children admitted under RTE from 30 in 2013 to nearly 600 in 2014.

Prayaas 
Launched in 2004, Prayaas impacts the lives underprivileged students by directly providing them a higher quality of education through specially appointed teachers, with classes running out of the New Campus, as also through funding drives that enable students to move to better schools, in a hope for better education and better lives. The IIMA community actively helps the children with their homework and preparation for examinations. Additionally, the children use the campus' facilities and participate in activities like painting, dance, crafts, etc.

SMILE 
IIMA, in association with the Wagh Bakri Group, set up an initiative called SMILE (Student Mediated Initiative for Learning to Excel) to educate underprivileged kids wherein students will conduct classes in their free time. This has been piloted in a space provided by the Ahmedabad Municipal Corporation (AMC) under a flyover near the IIMA campus.

People

Notable alumni
 
Among BSE 500 CEOs with MBA, the highest proportion come from IIM Ahmedabad. IIM-A alumni have garnered 9 Padma Awards – 4 Padma Bhushan awards (K. V. Kamath, CK Prahalad, Mallika Sarabhai and M. S. Banga) and 5 Padma Shri awards (Kiran Karnik, Kailasam Raghavendra Rao, S. P. Kothari, Sanjeev Bikhchandani, and Srikant Datar). Other notable alumni are Raghuram Rajan, Arvind Subramanian, Harsha Bhogle, Rashmi Bansal, Chetan Bhagat, Ajaypal Singh Banga, Ivan Menezes, Deep Kalra, and Shikha Sharma, Gopi Rathod.

Notable faculty
Past and present faculty at IIM Ahmedabad include three former Governors of the Reserve Bank of India – C. Rangarajan (1968–1982), former Director I. G. Patel (1996–2001), and Y. Venugopal Reddy (current Professor of Practice). Other notable faculty over the years have been:

 C. K. Prahalad, famous management thinker, exponent of Core competency and Fortune at the Bottom of the Pyramid
 Ravi J. Matthai, first full-time Director, management educationist noted for establishing Institute of Rural Management Anand
 Bakul Harshadrai Dholakia, Padma Shri awardee, Director (2002–2007)
 Samuel Paul, Padma Shri awardee, IIMA's second director (1972–78)
 Ravindra Dholakia, member, Monetary Policy Committee (India), 2016-20
 Jayanth R Varma, member, Monetary Policy Committee (India), 2020-2024
 Vijay Govindarajan, a New York Times & Wall Street Journal best-selling author, Thinkers50 Hall of Fame 2019 & Coxe Distinguished Professor, Tuck School of Business
 Anil Kumar Gupta was a professor who was awarded Padma Shri for his contributions to management education.
 Pankaj Chandra, former Director, Indian Institute of Management Bangalore and current Vice Chancellor, Ahmedabad University
 G. Raghuram, Director, Indian Institute of Management Bangalore
 Shekhar Chaudhuri, former Director, Indian Institute of Management Calcutta
 Abhishek Mishra was a faculty member for six years, before leaving to become a member of Samajwadi Party and an elected MLA of Uttar Pradesh.
 Dheeraj Sharma, Director, Indian Institute of Management Rohtak
 Jahar Saha, Institute Director 1998–2002
Rajnish Rai

Other notable faculty include prominent scholars such as Marti G. Subrahmanyam, Ashish Nanda, and T. V. Rao, among others.

Others
N. R. Narayana Murthy, Indian IT industrialist and the co-founder of Infosys, got his first job as chief systems programmer at IIM Ahmedabad.

Endowment
The IIM Ahmedabad Endowment Fund is India's first endowment fund set up at a management school. The fund was established at IIM Ahmedabad in June 2020 from an initial corpus of ₹100 Crore provided by 10 founding alumni. The endowment aims to grow the fund to ₹1,000 Crore over the next five years.

The fund was launched by the Chairperson of IIM Ahmedabad Board of Governors, Kumar Mangalam Birla.

The initial corpus was contributed by 10 founding alumni from across batches. This includes Deep Kalra, Founder and Group CEO, MakeMyTrip, Sandeep Singhal and SK Jain, co-founders, WestBridge Capital, Sanjeev Bikhchandani, Founder & Executive Vice Chairman, Info Edge, Kavita Iyer, Trustee, SIFF, VT Bharadwaj, co-founder, A91 Partners, Ramesh Mangaleswaran, Senior Partner, McKinsey & Company, Meenakshi Ramesh, co-founder, Citizen Matters, Kuldeep Jain, founder, Cleanmax Enviro Energy Solutions, GV Ravishankar, MD, Sequoia Capital India, Arun Duggal, chairman, ICRA.

According to Ravishankar, MD, Sequoia Capital India, the plan for the fund is to invest in government securities.

The endowment fund will be managed by an independent Endowment Committee consisting of initial alumni contributors, and the Director, and Dean, Alumni and External Relations (AER) of IIM Ahmedabad. The purpose of the endowment is to "make a larger impact in the field of education, entrepreneurial leadership, management practice and public policy".

In popular culture 
2 States (2014 film) a Bollywood film based on the eponymous novel by Chetan Bhagat, starring Alia Bhatt and Arjun Kapoor, was shot at the IIM-A campus.

References

External links

 
 IIMA IDEA Telecom Center of Excellence 

Indian Institute of Management Ahmedabad
Ahmedabad
Business schools in Gujarat
Universities and colleges in Ahmedabad
Educational institutions established in 1961
1961 establishments in Gujarat